RDS2 is a Canadian French language discretionary sports specialty channel, acting as the secondary feed of French language television network Réseau des sports, owned by CTV Specialty Television Inc. The channel was launched on October 7, 2011, to coincide with the start of the 2011 MLB post-season; its launch night programming included coverage of the Division Series and a documentary on the Montreal Expos.

As with its English-language equivalent TSN2, it is a secondary outlet for programming that cannot be aired on the main network, and operates under the same Canadian Radio-television and Telecommunications Commission (CRTC) licence as RDS itself.

External links
  
 Bell Media Press Release: RDS2 Launches Nationally on Friday, Oct. 7
 Bell Media Press Release: RDS2 Launches on Vidéotron Tomorrow

Bell Media networks
Digital cable television networks in Canada
CTV Sports
French-language television networks in Canada
Sports television networks in Canada
Television channels and stations established in 2011
The Sports Network
Category C services